Rosemary Kilbourn  is a Canadian printmaker, illustrator and stained glass artist known for her work in wood engraving.

Early life and education 
Born in Toronto, Canada, Kilbourn attended high school at Havergal College. She graduated from the Ontario College of Art in 1953, then studied wood engraving at the Slade School in London, England.

Painting and wood engraving 
Upon returning to Ontario, she was commissioned to paint a mural for the new dining hall at the University of Western Ontario. Along with commissioned portraits, her early works included illustrating, with wood engravings, two books by her brother William Kilbourn, The Firebrand (1956); The Elements Combined (1960); and Farley Mowat's, The Desperate People (1959). Kilbourn worked actively in wood engraving from the 1960s to the 1980s. In addition to her book-sized wood engravings, Kilbourn used larger than normal wood blocks to engrave both landscape and figure compositions for individual prints. 

In 1976 she illustrated Florence Wyle's collection of poems Shadow of the Year published by Aliquando Press. Her wood engraving based on Frederick Philip Grove's Fruits of the Earth was featured on a Canadian memorial 17-cent stamp in 1979. Recently, with Anne Corkett, she selected poems by Richard Outram to accompany illustrations by Thoreau MacDonald, a work commissioned by the Arts and Letters Club in Toronto: South of North: Images of Canada by Richard Outram with drawings by Thoreau MacDonald (2007). In 2012 The Porcupine's Quill published Out of the Wood, a collection of eighty reproductions of wood engravings by Kilbourn, done over a period of fifty years, accompanied by short, elegiac fragments of text that elucidate her unique and influential aesthetic. Some of the reproductions fold out into a double spread; 'Out of the Wood' also includes a full-size reproduction of The Obedience of Noah, which gives an example of the large scale of some of Kilbourn's work.

Stained glass work 
In the late 1960s Kilbourn began to create stained glass window commissions for churches, including windows for St. Thomas's Anglican Church, Toronto where she illustrated one of T.S. Eliot's poems from the Four Quartets. Other windows include those in St. Bartholomew's Anglican Church in Ottawa.; St. Timothy's Anglican Church, Toronto; St. Michael and All Angels Anglican Church, Toronto; St. James' Cathedral Church, Toronto and Trinity Anglican Church, Ottawa, among others.

Studio and teaching 
Kilbourn has lived and worked in an old schoolhouse in the Albion Hills since 1957, and has taught at the Artists' Workshop in Toronto, Central Technical School, and McMaster University.

Honours and awards 
In 1977 Kilbourn was elected to the Royal Canadian Academy of Arts, and to England's Society of Wood Engravers in 2001. Her name was entered in Havergal College's Hall of Distinction in 2004.

Exhibitions
Kilbourn's work was featured in exhibitions at the National Gallery of Canada in 1966 and 1969. She participated in exhibitions with the British Society of Relief Block Printers from 1973 to 1975. A survey exhibition of Kilbourn's work was held at the Art Gallery of Hamilton in 2018-19.

Collections

 Montreal Museum of Fine Art
 Art Gallery of Greater Victoria
 Art Gallery of Peel
 Kitchener-Waterloo Art Gallery
 McMaster University
 University of Guelph
 University of Regina
 University of Calgary

References

External links
 Paddy Thomas et al., A History of Peel County: To Mark Its Centenary, County of Peel, 1967.

1931 births
Living people
Artists from Ontario
20th-century Canadian printmakers
People from Caledon, Ontario
Members of the Royal Canadian Academy of Arts
Alumni of the Slade School of Fine Art
20th-century Canadian women artists
Women printmakers
20th-century printmakers
21st-century Canadian women artists